Sanhe is a town under the administration of Hongze District, Huai'an, Jiangsu, China. , it has 4 residential communities and 15 villages under its administration.

References 

Township-level divisions of Jiangsu
Huai'an